Anelytra is an Asian genus of bush crickets in the tribe Agraeciini, belonging to the 'conehead' subfamily Conocephalinae.

Species
The Orthoptera Species File lists:
subgenus Anelytra Redtenbacher, 1891 (synonym Euanelytra Gorochov, 1994)
Anelytra adjacens Gorochov, 1994
Anelytra boku Helfert & Sänger, 1997
Anelytra compressa Shi & Qiu, 2009
Anelytra concolor Redtenbacher, 1891
Anelytra curvata Ingrisch, 1998
Anelytra dividata Ingrisch, 1998
Anelytra elongata Ingrisch, 1998
Anelytra eunigrifrons Ingrisch, 1998
Anelytra fastigata Ingrisch, 1990
Anelytra furcata Ingrisch, 1998
Anelytra gonioda Ingrisch, 1998
Anelytra hainanensis Shi, 2015
Anelytra indigena Gorochov, 1994
Anelytra jinghonga Shi & Qiu, 2009
Anelytra laotica Ingrisch, 1998
Anelytra localis Gorochov, 1994
Anelytra malaya Ingrisch, 1998
Anelytra multicurvata Shi & Qiu, 2009
Anelytra nigrifrons Redtenbacher, 1891 - type species
Anelytra punctata Redtenbacher, 1891
Anelytra robusta Ingrisch, 1990
Anelytra spinia Shi & Qiu, 2009
Anelytra styliana Ingrisch, 1998
Anelytra tristellata Ingrisch, 1990
Anelytra unica Ingrisch, 1998
subgenus Lichnofugia Ingrisch, 1998
subgenus Perianelytra Gorochov, 1994
Anelytra propria Gorochov, 1994
 subspecies A. propria pellucida Ingrisch, 1998
subgenus Stenanelytra
Auth. Gorochov, 2020 - Indochina, Philippines
Anelytra angusticauda Gorochov, 2020
Anelytra busuanga Gorochov, 2020
Anelytra nigra (Ingrisch, 1998)

References

External links
 

Conocephalinae
Tettigoniidae genera
Orthoptera of Asia